The Yellow Bird is a 2001 short film adapted by Faye Dunaway from the short story by Tennessee Williams, which was itself twice-adapted by Williams from the play Summer and Smoke and its revision The Eccentricities of a Nightingale. The film was directed by Dunaway and includes Dunaway, James Coburn, Brenda Blethyn, Michael Pitt, and Cynthia Watros as Alma Tutwiler.

External links
 

2001 films
Films directed by Faye Dunaway
2001 drama films